The Congress of the State of Baja California is the legislative branch of  the government of the State of Baja California. The Congress is the governmental deliberative body of  Baja California, which is equal to, and independent of, the executive.

The Congress is unicameral and consists of 25 deputies. 17 deputies are elected on a first-past-the-post basis, one for each district in which the entity is divided, while 8 are elected through a system of proportional representation. Deputies are elected to serve for a three-year term.

The Congress convenes in the Legislative Power building (edificio del Poder Legislativo), which is located in Mexicali, the capital city of the State.

Structure 
In order to carry out its duties, the Congress is organized in the following manner:

 Management bodies (Órganos de Dirección):
 The Board of Directors;
 The Political Coordination Board (JUCOPO).

 Working bodies (Órganos de Trabajo):
 Legislative Advice Committees;
 Standing Committees.

 Technical and Administrative bodies (Órganos Técnicos y Administrativos):
 Administrative Department;
 Accounting and Finance Department;
 Legislative Consulting Department;
 Auxiliary Departments:
 Legal Affairs Unit;
 Internal Comptroller Unit;
 Transparency Unit;
 Social Communication Unit.

See also
List of Mexican state congresses

References

External links
Official website

Government of Baja California
Baja California
Baja California